My Father Was Right (French: Mon père avait raison...) is a 1936 French romantic comedy film directed by Sacha Guitry and starring Guitry, Betty Daussmond, Paul Bernard, Serge Grave and Gaston Dubosc.  It is an adaptation of the 1919 play of the same title by Guitry.

It was shot at the Epinay Studios in Paris.

Cast 
 Sacha Guitry as Charles Bellanger
 Betty Daussmond as Germaine Bellanger, son épouse
 Paul Bernard as Maurice Bellanger, leur fils adulte
 Serge Grave as Maurice Bellanger, enfant
 Gaston Dubosc as Adolphe Bellanger, père de Charles
 Jacqueline Delubac as Loulou, amie de Maurice
 Marcel Lévesque as le docteur Mourier
 Pauline Carton as Marie Ganion, domestique des Bellanger
 Robert Seller as Émile Perducau, domestique des Bellanger

References

Bibliography 
 Dayna Oscherwitz & MaryEllen Higgins. The A to Z of French Cinema. Scarecrow Press, 2009.

External links 
 

1936 romantic comedy films
1936 films
Films directed by Sacha Guitry
French films based on plays
French romantic comedy films
1930s French-language films
Tobis Film films
Films shot at Epinay Studios
1930s French films